Kanal København (Channel Copenhagen) is a Danish commercial television channel, which can be seen in most parts of Denmark. It is a Pay-TV and Cable TV channel delivered by providers like Stofa, Waoo!, Dansk Bredbaand and others. It is quite unusual in that a very high percentage of the programs shown, are produced in Denmark and in the Danish language.

History of Kanal København
Kanal København started in 1990 as a replacement for the existing Kanal 23 (da) in the Copenhagen region, originally launched in 1984. It gained popularity with a mixture of programs ranging from entertainment, news, music and eroticism to consumer issues. A turning point was reached in 2004 when the channel reached even more viewers. The broadcast and production company Mediehuset København became responsible of the prime time program schedule and a new air look and graphical design was introduced.

Programs themes

The program schedule of Kanal København can roughly be divided into the following blocks:

5:00pm – 6:00pm: Debate and documentaries,
6:00pm – 8:00pm: Entertainment,
8:00pm – 10:00pm: Cultural programmes, 
10:00pm – 12:00am: Entertainment for youths,
After 12:00am: Erotic films

Examples of programs
 Hej København: a daily morning show with a variety of different guests
 Alea Jacta Est: a daily morning sports show that highlights the more obscure sports
 Off the record: a weekly music show
Mettes Mix: A weekly talkshow for women and men.
 Dansk Top Scenen: A music program with popular Danish music. The oldest program of its kind in Denmark.
 Roniky Comedy Show: A Danish crazy sketch show shown weekly.
 MC MagaCin: The only Danish consumer program about the world of motor bikes.
 En nation i krise – et fællesskab i tomgang: A number of programs about Denmark, the EU and the possibility of reaching the ambitious goals set by the Union for the time up until the year 2020.
 Københavnemiljøer: Programs about quite unknown and interesting small communities in the Copenhagen harbour area.
 Floor Wars: Elite dancers from all over the world participate in this breakdance competition called Floor Wars.

References

External links 

 
  (DK only)
 
 
 Kanal23.dk
 Mediehuset-kbh.dk

Television stations in Denmark
Mass media in Copenhagen
Television channels and stations established in 1984